Carlo Cesio or Carlo Cesi (17 April 1622– 6 January 1682) was a Baroque-style painter and engraver of the Roman school.

Biography
Cesio was born in 1622 at Antrodoco in the present Province of Rieti, then part of the Roman States. He was brought up at Rome, in the school of Pietro da Cortona, and was employed in several prominent public works during the pontificate of Alexander VII. He painted historical subjects. He died in 1686 at Rieti.

In the Quirinal, he painted The Judgment of Solomon, and others of his works are in Santa Maria Maggiore and in the Rotunda. Carlo Cesio was also an engraver of some eminence; we have by him several plates after the Italian painters of his time. His plates are etched and finished off with the graver, in a free, masterly style.

Among his works as an engraver:

The Virgin and Infant Jesus with St. John; half-length.
St. Andrew led to Martyrdom, prostrating himself before the Cross; after Guido.
The Frontispiece to the book entitled Discorsi della Musica.
Sixteen plates from the Pamphili Gallery; after Pietro da Cortona.
Forty-one plates (1657) of the Farnese Gallery; after Annibale Carracci.
Eight plates of the Buongiovanni Chapel in the church of St. Augustine at Rome; after Lanfranco.
A book of anatomical drawings, published posthumously in German: L'anatomia dei pittori del signore Carlo Cesio

References

External links 

 Images from Cognitione de muscoli del corpo humano From The College of Physicians of Philadelphia Digital Library

1622 births
1682 deaths
17th-century Italian painters
Italian male painters
Italian engravers